Entrance Island may refer to:

 Entrance Island (British Columbia)
 Entrance Island (Tasmania)
 Entrance Island (South Australia)
 Entrance Island (New Zealand), in Lake Te Anau
 Entrance Island (Queensland)
 Teafuaono or Entrance Island, Nukufetau, Tuvalu